Alvord Mountain is a mountain range in San Bernardino County, California. The mountain was named for Charles Alvord, who prospected in the area of the mountain between 1860 and 1862.  It is located 17.5 miles northeast of Yermo, California.

History
The Old Spanish Trail crossed Alvord Mountain at Impassable Pass, at the head of Spanish Canyon on its route between Bitter Spring and the Mojave River.

References 

Mountain ranges of Southern California
Mountain ranges of San Bernardino County, California
Old Spanish Trail (trade route)